Aqua Multiespacio is an office skyscraper in Valencia, Spain. This makes it the third tallest building in Valencia, after the Hilton Valencia and Torre de Francia.

The complex consists of two towers.  Construction began in 2002 and ended in 2006. The complex was designed by two architectural firms: E. Clerk Architects and L35 with Eduardo Simarro.  It is located near the City of Arts and Sciences. The five-story parking garage has a capacity of 2,400 vehicles. The construction of the parking garage took more than a year. The design of the study project was Jerde California, who specializes in the development of tertiary areas, however, it was Spanish architectural firms, Simarro and Escribano, which gave shape and form to the construction. Additionally, the buildings have art.

The building was opened on June 1, 2006 and has 110 stores in an area of 35,000 square meters. The office tower is 23,000 square meters, and there is also 16,000 square meters for two hotels. The construction cost was €240 million.

The shareholders for the project are Iberdrola estate, whose headquarters have been moved to the complex and Valencia Gesfesa residential.

See also 

 List of tallest buildings in Valencia

References 

Skyscrapers in Valencia
Buildings and structures completed in 2006
Skyscraper office buildings in Spain
Skyscraper hotels in Spain